Saidi Ntibazonkiza (born 1 May 1987) is a Burundian footballer who plays as a winger for a Tanzanian premier league club, Simba SC and the Burundian national team.

Career

Club
Ntibazonkiza started to play football at Vital'O. As an asylum seeker, he came to the Netherlands in 2005. NEC was the nearest professional football club, and because of that, he trained with their youth team. Eventually, NEC signed him on a permanent deal. At the beginning of the 2006–07 season, he began playing for the youth team, but was shortly thereafter promoted to the first-team squad. On 18 November 2006, against Sparta Rotterdam, Ntibazonkiza played his first game in the Eredivisie. After receiving a Dutch residence permit, Ntibazonkiza signed a contract binding him to NEC until the summer of 2009. He also signed another contract extension until 2012 in January 2009.

On 10 February 2017, Ntibazonkiza signed for Kazakhstan Premier League club Kaysar Kyzylorda.

After being released by Kaysar Kyzylorda, Ntibazonkiza returned to his first club, Burundian side Vital'O.

International career
Ntibazonkiza played for several Burundian youth teams, and for his national squad.

Career statistics

Club

International
Statistics accurate as of match played 26 March 2021.

International goals

References

External links
 
 

1987 births
Living people
Burundian footballers
Burundian expatriate footballers
Burundi international footballers
Vital'O F.C. players
Stade Malherbe Caen players
NEC Nijmegen players
MKS Cracovia (football) players
Akhisarspor footballers
FC Kaisar players
Eredivisie players
Ekstraklasa players
Süper Lig players
Kazakhstan Premier League players
Expatriate footballers in the Netherlands
Burundian expatriate sportspeople in the Netherlands
Expatriate footballers in Poland
Burundian expatriate sportspeople in Poland
Expatriate footballers in Turkey
Burundian expatriate sportspeople in Turkey
Expatriate footballers in Kazakhstan
Association football wingers